Alphonse-Marie Parent  (April 2, 1906 – October 7, 1970) was a Canadian priest, educator and academic administrator. He is best known for having given his name to the Parent Report on the reform of Quebec's education system.

He was ordained a priest in 1929, and obtained a doctorate in philosophy from the Catholic University of Louvain. During the 1940s, he worked for the Austrian imperial family and for Pope Pius XII.

In 1965, he received an honorary doctorate from Sir George Williams University, which later became Concordia University.

From 1961 to 1966, he was president of the Royal Commission of Enquiry on Teaching in Quebec. The commission's recommendations led to the creation of the Quebec's CEGEP which replaced the classical colleges.  In 1967, he was made a Companion of the Order of Canada.

His funeral took place at the Notre-Dame de Québec Cathedral.

References

 Fonds Alphonse-Marie Parent 

1906 births
1970 deaths
Fellows of the Royal Society of Canada
Companions of the Order of Canada
People from Chaudière-Appalaches
Rectors of Université Laval
20th-century Canadian Roman Catholic priests